QBD may stand for:

QBD (electronics)
Quantum brain dynamics, a Quantum mind theory
Quasi-birth-death process
Quality by Design (QbD)
Queen Black Dragon, a boss monster in the MMORPG RuneScape
Queen's Bench Division
Queensland Book Depot
Quick Business Deposit, a trademark of Bank of America